Murder in Eden is a 1961 British mystery film directed by Max Varnel and starring Ray McAnally, Catherine Feller and Yvonne Buckingham. The screenplay involves the murder of an art critic and the subsequent hunt for the killer.

Plot
The Woolf Art Gallery is promoting an exhibition of paintings under the title "The Garden of Eden". A man peers strongly at a picture of Eve forming one of a pair representing Adam and Eve by a Dutch artist Van Meerwick.

After he discovers a famous painting is fake, a noted art critic is killed by a hit-and-run driver. Inspector Peter Sharkey of Scotland Yard joins forces with French magazine reporter Geneviève Beaujean to investigate.

Genevieve spends a lot of time at the gallery. It is revealed she is not a real reporter. The police find a portfolio belonging to the dead man. It states the best forger is Michael Lucas but his work is revealed by the use of zinc white.

Michael Lucas has the real Eve hidden in a secret room in his seaside villa... he has promised to sell it to  Bill Robson and shows him the secret room. Genevieve listens to them chat from the secret room. She has a gun. The police arrive and hear her crying in the secret room.

Cast
 Ray McAnally ...  Insp. Peter Sharkey
 Catherine Feller ...  Geneviève Beaujean 
 Yvonne Buckingham ...  Vicky Woolf 
 Norman Rodway ...  Michael Lucas 
 Mark Singleton ...  Arnold Woolf, gallery owner
 Jack Aranson ...  Bill Robson 
 Robert Lepler ...  Max Aaronson, Art Critic 
 Angela Douglas ...  Beatnik
 Francis O'Keefe ...  Sgt. Johnson 
 Noel Sheridan ...  Frenchman Jack 
 Ronald Walsh ...  Bodyguard 
 John Sterling ...  Art Expert 
 Frank O'Donovan ...  Manservant 
 Eithne Lydon ...  Receptionist

References

External links

1961 films
British mystery films
Films directed by Max Varnel
1960s English-language films
1960s British films